2577 Litva, provisional designation , is a Hungarian-type Mars-crosser and rare trinary asteroid from the inner regions of the asteroid belt, approximately 4 kilometers in diameter.

It was discovered on 12 March 1975, by Soviet–Ukrainian astronomer Nikolai Chernykh at the Crimean Astrophysical Observatory in Nauchnyj, on the Crimean peninsula. It was named for the former Lithuanian Soviet Socialist Republic, which is now the nation of Lithuania.

Orbit and classification 

Litva is a member of the Hungaria family, which form the innermost dense concentration of asteroids in the Solar System. It orbits the Sun at a distance of 1.6–2.2 AU once every 2 years and 8 months (960 days). Its orbit has an eccentricity of 0.14 and an inclination of 23° with respect to the ecliptic.

Physical characteristics 

In the Tholen taxonomy, Litva is classified as an EU-type, a subtype of the bright E-type asteroids. It has also been characterized as a Sl-type and Q-type asteroid by astronomers using the New Technology Telescope at La Silla and by PanSTARRS photometric survey, respectively.

Rotation period 

The body has a rotation period between 2.81288 and 2.82 hours, superseding the original measurement that gave 5.618 hours. Most recent photometric observation from 2014, gave a refined period of  hours, using a statistical Bayesian inference methodology.

Trinary system 

In March 2009 the Central Bureau for Astronomical Telegrams announced the discovery of a moon orbiting the asteroid. The satellite measures about 1.4 kilometer in diameter and orbits Litva at distance of 21 kilometers, with an orbital period of 1 day, 11 hours, and 53 minutes. In 2012, a second satellite orbiting at a distance of 378 kilometers, with a diameter of 1.2 kilometers, was discovered, with a rotation period of 214 days. The discovery was announced in late 2013. This made 2577 Litva the 11th asteroid discovered to be in a trinary system.

Naming 

This minor planet was named after the Russian name for the Baltic state Lithuania, former member of the Soviet Union and now an independent Republic. The official naming citation was published by the Minor Planet Center on 1 December 1982.

Notes

References

External links 
 Lightcurve plot of 2577 Litva, Palmer Divide Observatory, B. D. Warner (2010)
 Central Bureau for Astronomical Telegrams – CBET No. 1715
 Asteroid Lightcurve Database (LCDB), query form (info )
 Dictionary of Minor Planet Names, Google books
 Asteroids and comets rotation curves, CdR – Observatoire de Genève, Raoul Behrend
 Discovery Circumstances: Numbered Minor Planets (1)-(5000) – Minor Planet Center
 
 

002577
002577
Discoveries by Nikolai Chernykh
Named minor planets
002577
002577
19750312